The Guardian Assurance Company was a British insurance company based in London and formed in 1821 to offer both life and fire insurance. Through a combination of organic growth and acquisition it became one of the leading insurance companies. It operated as a mutual organization, meaning that it was owned by its policyholders rather than by shareholders. In 1968 it merged with Royal Exchange to form Guardian Royal Exchange.

History

The first hundred years

There ae no records of the original meetings or the motivation of the promotors but it is believed that there was a substantial involvement by bankers. The Chairman, Stewart Marjoribanks was an East India merchant and the Deputy Chairman, Richard Mee Raikes later became Governor of the Bank of England. A notice in The Times in November 1821 stated that the Court of Directors of Guardian Fire and Life announce that a general meeting of the subscribers will be held at the City of London Tavern on 10th of December when the Deed of Settlement will be submitted for approval.   On the following February the Directors announced that “the principles upon which this Institution have been founded have been adopted” and the subscribed capital was £1,500,000.  One of the unexplained “principles” of, to use its full name, the Guardian Fire and Life Assurance Company. was that no shares were to be granted to persons resident in the Metropolis or within ten miles, except by permission. 

Unlike most insurance companies at the time, the Guardian offered both fire insurance and life assurance from the outset but it was the latter that made the greater contribution to profits. The important task of constructing mortality tables was entrusted to Griffith Davies; along with Benjamin Gompertz, Davies was considered one of the pioneers of life tables. The first task of the fire department was to establish its own fire brigade but it was soon looking further afield. As early as 1822, foreign business was being considered. The Directors resolved to avoid risks in America and the Levant but did accept a proposal to insure a church in St Petersburg. 

After the seven-year life fund valuation, the first dividends were paid in 1829. In the period from 1821 to 1860, fire profits of £79,000 compared with the £652,000 transferred from the life account. Life business grew rapidly and by 1842 there were 4,079 policies in force, assuring £4.6 million. After that, new business declined rapidly “and apparently little effort was made”. This malaise lasted until about 1880 when a branch and agency system introduced. In 1883 the Guardian bought the London and Provincial Law Assurance Society: the number of policies rose from 4,518 in 1879 to 7,192 in 1884 and by 1914 these had risen to 15,750. However, in the early 1860s, as the life business languished,whereas the fire department began an active overseas expansion. In 1863, agencies were appointed in Canada and in 1868 agencies were opened in Colombo, Penang, Montreal, Nova Scotia and Russia. The first United States. agency was opened in New York in 1869 but in 1894 the Guardian withdrew from that market. Acquisitions featured and between 1890 and 1892 the Guardian bought three business in South Africa, one in France and one in Canada. 

By the close of the nineteenth century, the Guardian was expanding the range of its non-life business. Following the Workmen's Compensation Act 1897 the Guardian opened an accident department. In 1907-8 it bought two plate glass insurance companies to enter the glass market. The one important area missing from the Guardian portfolio was marine insurance and this was rectified in 1917 with the purchase of Reliance Marine – the only acquisition satisfied by the issue of shares.

In 1893, an Act of Parliament had allowed the Guardian to register as a company under the Companies Acts. It was renamed Guardian Assurance in 1902.

Merger and acquisition

In 1967 it acquired Union Insurance Society of Canton Ltd. In 1968 it then merged with Royal Exchange Assurance to form Guardian Royal Exchange Assurance.

In February 1999 the Guardian Royal Exchange was purchased by AXA who subsequently sold the Life and Pensions business to AEGON NV, later that same year. Aegon then sold the business to Cinven in 2011.  The Guardian Assurance and Guardian Financial Services brands continued to operate under Cinven through until January 2016, when Guardian Financial Services was acquired by Swiss Re's closed book holding company, Admin Re.

The Guardian Financial Services brands have now been acquired by Gryphon Group Holdings Limited, in December 2017, with "Guardian" being the brand for their new challenger protection business, which launches in 2018. Guardian Assurance Limited is also being acquired by Gryphon.

Further reading

Tarn and Byles [comp.], A Record of the Guardian Assurance Company 1821-1921, London, 1921.

References

External links
 

British companies established in 1821
Companies formerly listed on the London Stock Exchange
Financial services companies based in London
Insurance companies of the United Kingdom
Financial services companies established in 1821